

The Albatros L 73 was a German twin-engined biplane airliner of the 1920s. Of conventional configuration, it featured a streamlined, boat-like fuselage and engine nacelles. All four manufactured aircraft of that type were operated by Deutsche Luft Hansa, one of which (Brandenburg, D-961) crashed near Babekuhl on 28 May 1928.

Variants
L 73a powered by two  Siemens-built Bristol Jupiter.
L 73bversion with Junkers L5 engines
L 73cengines upgraded to BMW V

Operators

Bulgarian Air Force

Deutsche Luft Hansa

Specifications (L 73b)

References

Further reading

External links
 German Aircraft between 1919-1945

L 073
1920s German airliners